Alicinte Anveshanam is a 1989 Malayalam-language film written and directed by T. V. Chandran.The story revolves around a woman named Alice(Jalaja) who goes in search of her missing husband.

Plot
Set in northern Kerala, the film narrates the journey of Alice in search of her missing husband, a college lecturer. During her quest, she slowly discovers disturbing aspects of her husband, including his descent from his earlier radicalism into bourgeois degeneracy. In the end she gives up her search and decides to take responsibility for her own life.

Cast
 Nilambur Balan
 Jalaja as Alice 
 Nedumudi Venu
 P. T. K. Mohamed
 T. Ravindranath
 Gangadharan Chemmangatt

Credits
 Direction & Screenplay: T. V. Chandran
 Cast: Jalaja, Ravindranath, Nedumudi Venu, C. V. Sriraman
 Cinematography: Sunny Joseph
 Music: Ouseppachan

Awards
It was nominated for the Golden Leopard at Locarno International Film Festival in 1990. It also won the Kerala State Film Award for Second Best Film in 1990.

References

External links
 
 T. V. Chandran's profile at Cinemaofmalayalam.net

1989 films
Films scored by Ouseppachan
1980s Malayalam-language films
Films directed by T. V. Chandran